The 1962 Bucknell Bison football team was an American football team that represented Bucknell University during the 1962 NCAA College Division football season. Bucknell finished second in the University Division of the Middle Atlantic Conference.

In its fourth season under head coach Bob Odell, the team compiled a 6–3 record, 5–1 against division opponents. Richard Tyrrell was the team captain.

The team played its home games at Memorial Stadium on the university campus in Lewisburg, Pennsylvania.

Schedule

References

Bucknell
Bucknell Bison football seasons
Bucknell Bison football